Sibnath Banerjee was an Indian revolutionary and trade-union leader who founded Hind Mazdoor Sabha and served as President of All India Trade Union Congress.

Personal life 

He was born on July 11, 1897. In 1935, he was arrested by British government. On February 16, 1927, he died.

Honor 

 In 1997, India Post honored him by issuing stamp on him.

References 

Indian revolutionaries
Year of birth missing (living people)